Dasyllio is a village and a community of the Grevena municipality. Before the 2011 local government reform it was a part of the municipality of Kosmas o Aitolos, of which it was a municipal district. The 2011 census recorded 12 residents in the village. The community of Dasyllio covers an area of 7.947 km.Dasyllio is a mountain village in the prefecture of Grevena. It is built at an altitude of 1,000 meters on the slopes of Smolikas. The old name of the village until 1927 was Mager [2].
With the Kapodistrias Program, Dasyllio was a municipal district of the Municipality of Kosmas Etolos. Since 2011, with the Kallikratis Program, Dasyllio is a local community and belongs to the Municipal Unit of Kosma Aetolou, the Municipality of Grevena, the Regional Unit of Grevena, in the Region of Western Macedonia. According to the 2001 census it has 43 inhabitants and according to the 2011 census it has 12 inhabitants.

See also
 List of settlements in the Grevena regional unit

References

External links
Website of Dasyllio Grevena

Populated places in Grevena (regional unit)